Dorothy Podber (September 15, 1932 – February 9, 2008) was an American performance artist.

Born in the Bronx to a mother who had tried repeatedly to abort her, and to a father who worked for the Jewish mobster Dutch Schultz, Podber was later remembered as a disruptive influence by classmates from West Walton High School.

A wild child of the New York City art scene in the 1950s and 1960s, she helped to run the Nonagon Gallery, which showed the work of a young Yoko Ono and was known for jazz concerts by such performers as Charles Mingus. However, her greatest fame—and notoriety—came from her work as a muse and collaborator with more prominent artists. On one occasion in 1964 she visited The Factory, Andy Warhol's studio, and put a bullet through a stack of his silk-screen paintings of Marilyn Monroe, after which she was banned from the studio. These four paintings were thereafter called The Shot Marilyns, and two are among the most expensive paintings ever sold. 

Podber revelled in her bad-girl reputation. In an interview in 2006, she said:

I've been bad all my life. Playing dirty tricks on people is my specialty.

When funds were low, she found unorthodox ways of making money, engaging in businesses as diverse as dispatching maids to doctors' offices in an attempt to gain access to their drug cabinets, and running an illegal abortion referral service. She did paperwork for B'nai Brith long enough to pick their safe and use its contents on her own check-counterfeiting machine. Her attitude to these enterprises bordered on indifference. "I never worked much," she reputedly said.

She was married three times, and had numerous casual liaisons. Her last husband was Lester Schwartz, a bisexual, who had a long-term relationship with actor/director Julian Beck. Schwartz died in 1986.  Podber cited bisexuality as something she and Schwartz had in common. One boyfriend was a banker with whom she would have sexual intercourse only on the banknote-strewn floor of his firm's vault. She had no children by any of her partners. She died in her Manhattan apartment on February 9, 2008, from natural causes, aged 75.

References

Sources
 Livingstone, Marco (ed.), Pop Art: An International Perspective, The Royal Academy of Arts, London, 1991, 
 Stokstad, Marilyn, Art History, 1995, Prentice Hall, Inc., and Harry N. Abrams, Inc., Publishers, 
 Vogel, Carol (1998). The New York Times:  INSIDE ART; Perhaps Shot, Perhaps Not. Retrieved January 4, 2008.
 Warhol, Andy and Pat Hackett, Popism: The Warhol Sixties, Harcourt Books, 1980, 
 Watson, Steven, Factory Made: Warhol and the Sixties, Pantheon Books, 2003.

External links
 Dorothy Podber obit
 The Independent: "Dorothy Podber: 'Witch' who shot Warhol's Marilyns"

 

1932 births
2008 deaths
American female criminals
20th-century American Jews
American performance artists
Bisexual artists
Bisexual women
American LGBT artists
LGBT Jews
Artists from New York City
Muses
21st-century American Jews
20th-century LGBT people
21st-century LGBT people